The World Famous Sex Buffet is a studio album by Canadian rapper Josh Martinez. It was released on Camobear Records in 2008.

"Underground Pop" was chosen by Willamette Week as their Cut of the Day on September 18, 2008.

Track listing

References

External links

2008 albums
Josh Martinez albums